The 1883 Birthday Honours were appointments by Queen Victoria to various orders and honours to reward and highlight good works by citizens of the British Empire. The appointments were made to celebrate the official birthday of the Queen, and were published in The London Gazette on 24 May 1883.

The recipients of honours are displayed here as they were styled before their new honour, and arranged by honour, with classes (Knight, Knight Grand Cross, etc.) and then divisions (Military, Civil, etc.) as appropriate.

United Kingdom and British Empire

Knight Bachelor
Jacobus Petrus de Wet, formerly Recorder of Griqualand West and Chief Justice of the Transvaal, and lately Acting Chief Justice of the Island of Ceylon
Roderick William Cameron, Commissioner for Canada to the Australian International Exhibitions
Alfred Roberts, honorary secretary and consulting surgeon to Prince Alfred Hospital, Sydney, New South Wales

The Most Distinguished Order of Saint Michael and Saint George

Knight Grand Cross of the Order of St Michael and St George (GCMG)
The Right Honourable Lord Blachford  formerly Under Secretary of State for the Colonies
Sir Henry Ernest Bulwer  Governor of the Colony of Natal
Sir James Robert Longden  Governor of the Island of Ceylon

Knight Commander of the Order of St Michael and St George (KCMG)
Colonel Charles Warren, Royal Engineers  in recognition of his services in connection with the bringing to justice the murderers of the late Professor Palmer and his party
William Robinson  Governor of the Windward Islands
George William Des Vœux  Governor of the Colony of Fiji
Colonel Robert William Harley  Lieutenant-Governor of the Colony of British Honduras
Charles Cameron Lees  Governor of the Bahama Islands
Frederick Palgrave Barlee  lately Lieutenant-Governor of the Colony of British Honduras
John Douglas  Lieutenant-Governor and Colonial Secretary of the Island of Ceylon
Charles Hutton Gregory  Past President of the Institution of Civil Engineers, Consulting Engineer to several Colonial Governments
Lieutenant-Colonel Charles Bullen Hugh Mitchell , Royal Marines, Colonial Secretary, and lately Administrator of the Government of Natal
Hugh Low  British Resident at Perak, in the Malay Peninsula
William Morgan, for some time First Minister of the Colony of South Australia
Ambrose Shea, for many years Member, and sometime Speaker of the Legislative Assembly of the Colony of Newfoundland

Companion of the Order of St Michael and St George (CMG)
Michael Henry Gallwey, Attorney-General of Natal
Major-General Saverio Gatt, late of the Royal Malta Fencible Artillery
Colonel Edward Osborne Hewett, Royal Engineers, Commandant of the Royal Military College in the Dominion of Canada
The Honourable Walter Francis Hely-Hutchinson, Chief Secretary to the Government of Malta
John Francis Julius Von Haast  Member of the Senate of the University of New Zealand
Edward Laborde, Colonial Secretary and Administrator of the Government of the Island of Tobago
Macnamara Dix, Colonial Treasurer of Saint Lucia
Charles Brownlee, Chief Magistrate, Griqualand East
John Frederick Dickson, Government Agent and Fiscal for the North Central Province of the Island of Ceylon
Charles Bright, of the Colony of Victoria

References

Birthday Honours
1883 awards
1883 in Australia
1883 in the United Kingdom